East Farm, also known as the Archibald M. Brown Estate, is a national historic district located at Head of the Harbor in Suffolk County, New York.  The district encompasses an estate with seven contributing buildings and one contributing site.  The estate house was originally built in the 18th century about 1690 and as the Smith family farmhouse, then greatly enlarged by its architect-owner in 1910.  It is a wood framed, clapboarded structure with a wood shingle roof, and Colonial in style.  Also on the property are a contributing barn with shed, milk house, two cottages, and barn and garage complex.  The estate also retains an intact formal garden.

It was added to the National Register of Historic Places in 1993.

References

External links
Harmony Vineyards
East Farm (Old Long Island)

Farms on the National Register of Historic Places in New York (state)
Historic districts on the National Register of Historic Places in New York (state)
Colonial Revival architecture in New York (state)
Houses completed in 1710
Houses in Suffolk County, New York
National Register of Historic Places in Suffolk County, New York
1710 establishments in the Province of New York